The 1905William & Mary Orange and White football team was an American football team that represented the College of William & Mary as a member of the Eastern Virginia Intercollegiate Athletic Association (EVIAA) during the 1905 college football season. Led by J. Merrill Blanchard in his second and final season as head coach, the Orange and White compiled an overall record of 2–4–1.

Schedule

References

William and Mary
William & Mary Tribe football seasons
William and Mary Orange and White football